The Resket Tower (also spelled Resget) is a monument in Sari, Iran. The tower was constructed in the 11th-century.  A stucco is written on the entrance, in Arabic and Pahlavi, which states that the mausoleum was built for the two Bavandid princes Hormozdiyar and Habusiyar. The person behind the construction of the tower was most likely the father of the two princes, named Masdara.

Sources 
 

Towers in Iran
Towers completed in the 11th century
Bavandid architecture
Buildings and structures in Mazandaran Province
Tourist attractions in Mazandaran Province
Tourist attractions in Sari